Anglin Lake is a reservoir in the boreal forest ecozone in the Canadian province of Saskatchewan. It is located to the east of Prince Albert National Park in the central part of the province in the District of Lakeland No. 521. The only community on the lake is Anglin Lake.

Anglin Lake history 
Anglin Lake is a man-made lake in the Spruce River watershed. Beginning in the early 1900s, several different dams were built at varying stages along the Spruce River with the current dam being completed in 1960. Prior to the construction of any of the dams, Anglin Lake was a series of smaller lakes connected by natural channels that only flowed into the Spruce River in high water level years. In 1939, the first major dam was completed along the Spruce River. This dam backed up the water creating Jacobsen Bay (the westernmost portion of modern-day Anglin Lake) and connected it to the upstream East Anglin Lake (presently the main body of Anglin Lake), creating a larger body of water connected by a narrow channel. At the entrance to Jacobsen Bay, three different dams were constructed in 1936, 1940, and 1954 to regulate the water levels of Jacobsen Bay and East Anglin Lake. Collectively, these three dams were known as the Tower Road Dams.

The 1939 dam had a history of washouts. That, combined with the need to regulate water levels in two nearby recreational lakes (Emma and Christopher Lakes), it was decided a new dam was needed. Two-and-a-half kilometres downstream, the Spruce River Dam was built in 1960 by the Government of Canada's Department of Northern Affairs to regulate flow on the river and to provide additional water for a diversion into Emma and Christopher Lakes. This new dam created a body of water between it and the original 1939 dam. The increased volume of Anglin Lake connected it to Little Anglin Lake, creating a new bay called Christie Bay at the north-west corner of the lake where Bitter Creek flows in.

Emma Lake Diversion 
The Emma Lake diversion is a 10-kilometre long diversion channel that runs from Anglin Lake to Emma Lake. The channel begins at a pumphouse about one kilometre north-east of the Spruce River Dam. The pumphouse lifts water up from Anglin Lake eight metres through 284 metres of pipeline to a channel that leads to Gladys Lake. From there, gravity takes the water through a series of ditches, natural channels, and Blanche and Mae Lakes into the northern end of Emma Lake. The diversion and pumphouse are operated by the Saskatchewan Water Security Agency.

Parks and recreation 
Most of the lake is within Great Blue Heron Provincial Park. Fishing, swimming, hiking, and camping are activities on and around the lake. Rentals, such as boats, and accommodations are available at Land of the Loon Resort / Jacobsen Bay Outfitters. The westernmost point of the lake is in Prince Albert National Park.

Campgrounds found on the lake include Spruce River, Anderson Point, and Anglin Lake North.

A Scouts Canada camp, Anglin Lake Semi-Wilderness Camp, is located on the north-eastern shore.

Fish species 
Fish commonly found in the lake include chain pickerel, walleye, yellow perch, and northern pike.

See also 
List of lakes of Saskatchewan
Tourism in Saskatchewan

References 

Lakes of Saskatchewan
Lakeland No. 521, Saskatchewan
Prince Albert National Park